Pedrola is a municipality located in the province of Zaragoza, Aragon, Spain. According to the 2004 census (INE), the municipality has a population of 2,906 inhabitants.

Notable people 
 Fermín Abella y Blave, (1832–1888) Spanish writer and jurist

References

Municipalities in the Province of Zaragoza